is a Japanese tokusatsu television franchise that began in 1972 by P Productions as Extraordinary Hero Lion-Maru. The basic premise of the series is that the main character has the ability to transform into a superpowered anthropomorphic lion, usually wielding a katana. The original two series were set in feudal Japan and were, essentially, tokusatsu versions of the samurai dramas that were extremely popular at the time. The 2006 program, Lion-Maru G, is set in the near future, but still uses the samurai motif for the designs of the main characters.

Series
Kaiketsu Lion-Maru (1972)
Fuun Lion-Maru (1973)
Lion-Maru G (2006)

Tokusatsu television series